Sadr ol Din (also Romanized as Şadr ol Dīn and Şadr od Dīn) is a village in Chaldoran-e Shomali Rural District, in the Central District of Chaldoran County, West Azerbaijan Province, Iran. At the 2006 census, its population was 69, in 14 families.

References 

Populated places in Chaldoran County